Jan Suchopárek (born 23 September 1969) is a Czech football coach and former defender, who is head coach of the Czech Republic U21 national team.

He played for Czechoslovakia and later the Czech Republic, playing a combined total of 61 international matches, scoring 4 goals. Suchopárek was a participant at UEFA Euro 1996, where the Czech Republic won the silver medal. He scored in the group stage against Russia and played in the UEFA Euro 1996 Final, where the Czech Republic lost to Germany.

At club level, Suchopárek played for Prague teams Dukla and Slavia before moving to France, where he played for RC Strasbourg. He finished his career in the Czech Second League, where he played for Kladno.

Playing career

Early career
Suchopárek was born in Kladno. In his country, he played for Dukla Prague before moving on to Slavia Prague, where he played from 1991 to 1996. In this time he captained the title-winning team in the 1995–96 Czech First League, as well as being involved in Slavia's progression to the semi final stage of the 1995–96 UEFA Cup.

Euro 1996
Suchopárek played in the Czech Republic's opening game of the UEFA Euro 1996 tournament, a loss to Germany. He picked up a yellow card in the next group match against Italy, which the Czechs won against expectations, by a 2–1 scoreline. Suchopárek scored with a header in the last group match against Russia, which finished 3–3 and meant that the Czech Republic advanced to the quarter-finals of the tournament.

Suchopárek was shown the yellow card in the first minute of the quarter final match against Portugal, which the Czechs went on to win 1–0 thanks to a Karel Poborský strike. However, since he had received two yellow cards in the tournament, Suchopárek was one of four Czech players to miss the semi-final clash with France due to suspension. He returned to the team for the final against Germany, although again the Germans prevailed, winning 2–1 thanks to a golden goal in extra time.

Time abroad
Suchopárek was one of players from the Czech squad at UEFA Euro 1996 who left the Czech Republic to play in another country after the tournament, signing for RC Strasbourg in July 1996.

During his time playing club football abroad, Suchopárek continued to represent his national team, playing the complete 90 minutes of seven consecutive games in UEFA Euro 2000 qualifying. However, despite the Czech Republic qualifying, Suchopárek missed the UEFA Euro 2000 tournament due to a knee injury.

Following three years in France with Strasbourg and a further year in Germany at Tennis Borussia Berlin, Suchopárek returned to the Czech Republic to play for Slavia Prague again in 2000.

Return to the Czech Republic
Suchopárek captained Slavia during his second spell. He had surgery in March 2001 following a tear of meniscus, being the second knee operation he had within a year. In 2001, following Slavia's exit from the 2001–02 UEFA Cup in the first round, Suchopárek was sent to the "B" team of Slavia due to inadequate performances.

He later moved to SK Kladno to finish his playing career in the Czech 2. Liga. While playing for Kladno in 2004, Suchopárek dislocated his shoulder attempting a bicycle kick.

Suchopárek retired from professional football following the end of the 2004–05 Czech 2. Liga, in which Kladno finished fourth and missed promotion to the Czech First League on the last day of the season.

Non-playing career
During his time at Kladno, Suchopárek started studying for the UEFA Pro Licence, which he completed after two years.

Following his playing career, Suchopárek became a coach at SK Kladno, where he remained until 2010, when he moved to FK Dukla Prague to become assistant to Luboš Kozel. He is also a coach for the Czech Republic U21 national team. At the end of the 2015–16 season, Suchopárek left Dukla, along with Kozel, following the expiry of their contracts. He was named new head coach of the Czech Republic U19, replacing Pavel Malura.

Honours
Dukla Prague
Czechoslovak Cup: 1989–90

Slavia Prague
Czech First League: 1995–96
Czech Cup: 2001–02

Strasbourg
Coupe de la Ligue: 1997

Czech Republic
UEFA European Championship runners-up: 1996

References

External links
 
 

1969 births
Living people
Sportspeople from Kladno
Czech footballers
Czech Republic international footballers
Czechoslovak footballers
Czechoslovakia international footballers
Dual internationalists (football)
Czech expatriate footballers
Association football defenders
Czech First League players
Ligue 1 players
2. Bundesliga players
Dukla Prague footballers
SK Slavia Prague players
RC Strasbourg Alsace players
Tennis Borussia Berlin players
SK Kladno players
Expatriate footballers in France
Expatriate footballers in Germany
UEFA Euro 1996 players
Czech expatriate sportspeople in France
Czech expatriate sportspeople in Germany
Czech football managers
Association football coaches